Porte des Lilas (English: Gate of Lilacs) is a 1957 French-Italian dramatic film directed by René Clair, based on René Fallet's novel La Grande Ceinture. The film is known as both Gates of Lilacs and The Gates of Paris, but was released under the latter title in the United States.

Plot
Artiste is an unemployed impoverished man who dwells in his own, derelict house with his likewise unemployed best friend Juju. One day they come across the wanted criminal Barbier hiding in their home. Juju admires the threefold murderer, yet when he witnesses him bragging about having compromised a girl for financial benefit, his feelings turn straight into the opposite and he shoots Barbier dead.

Cast
 Pierre Brasseur as Juju
 Georges Brassens as Artiste
 Henri Vidal as Pierre Barbier
 Dany Carrel as Maria
 Raymond Bussières as Alphonse
 Gabrielle Fontan as Madame Sabatier
 Amédée as Paulo - a regular at the café
 Annette Poivre as Nénette
  as Paulo's friend
 Alice Tissot as the concierge
 Paul Préboist

Awards
The film was nominated for the Academy Award for Best Foreign Language Film and a BAFTA Award in 1958 and won the Bodil Award for Best European Film.

See also
 List of submissions to the 30th Academy Awards for Best Foreign Language Film
 List of French submissions for the Academy Award for Best Foreign Language Film

References

External links

1957 films
1957 drama films
French black-and-white films
French drama films
Italian drama films
1950s French-language films
Films directed by René Clair
Unemployment in fiction
1950s French films
1950s Italian films